Mark Joseph Carney  (born March 16, 1965) is a Canadian economist and banker who served as the governor of the Bank of Canada from 2008 to 2013 and the governor of the Bank of England from 2013 to 2020. Since October 2020, he is vice chairman and head of Impact Investing at Brookfield Asset Management. He was the chair of the Financial Stability Board from 2011 to 2018. Prior to his governorships, Carney worked at Goldman Sachs as well as the Department of Finance Canada.

Early life
Carney was born on March 16, 1965, in Fort Smith, Northwest Territories, the son of Verlie Margaret (née Kemper) and Robert James Martin Carney.

When Carney was six, his family moved to Edmonton, Alberta. Carney has three siblings — an older brother and sister, Seán and Brenda, and a younger brother Brian. Carney attended St. Francis Xavier High School, Edmonton before studying at Harvard University.

Carney graduated from Harvard in 1988 with a bachelor's degree with high honours in economics, before postgraduate studies at the University of Oxford at St Peter's College and Nuffield College, where he received master's and doctoral degrees in the same field in 1993 and 1995, respectively. The title of his DPhil thesis is "The dynamic advantage of competition".

Career

Goldman Sachs
Carney spent 13 years at Goldman Sachs and worked in their Boston, London, New York City, Tokyo, and Toronto offices. His progressively more senior positions included: co-head of sovereign risk; executive director, emerging debt capital markets; and managing director, investment banking. He worked on South Africa's post-apartheid venture into international bond markets, and was involved in Goldman's work with the 1998 Russian financial crisis.

In 2003, Carney left Goldman Sachs to join the Bank of Canada as a deputy governor. One year later, he was recruited to join the Department of Finance Canada as senior associate deputy minister, beginning that role on November 15, 2004.

Department of Finance
From November 2004 to October 2007, Carney was the senior associate deputy minister and G7 deputy in the Canadian Finance Department. He served under two finance ministers: Ralph Goodale, a Liberal and Jim Flaherty, a Conservative. During this time Carney oversaw the Government of Canada's controversial plan to tax income trusts at source. Carney was also the lead on the federal government's profitable sale of its 19 percent stake in Petro-Canada.

Governor of the Bank of Canada
In November 2007, it was announced that Carney would be appointed Governor of the Bank of Canada. He immediately left his position at the Department of Finance to serve as an advisor to the outgoing governor, David Dodge, before formally assuming Dodge's position on February 1, 2008. Carney was selected over Paul Jenkins, the senior deputy governor, who had been considered the front-runner to succeed Dodge.

Carney took on this role at the beginning of the 2007 global financial crisis. At the time of his appointment, Carney was the youngest central bank governor among the G8 and G20.

Financial crisis
Carney's actions as Governor of the Bank of Canada are said to have played a major role in helping Canada avoid the worst impacts of the financial crisis.

The epoch-making feature of his tenure as Governor remains the decision to cut the overnight rate by 50 basis points in March 2008, only one month after his appointment. While the European Central Bank delivered a rate increase in July 2008, Carney anticipated the leveraged-loan crisis would trigger global contagion. When policy rates in Canada hit the effective lower-bound, the central bank combatted the crisis with the non-standard monetary tool: "conditional commitment" in April 2009 to hold the policy rate for at least one year, in a boost to domestic credit conditions and market confidence. Output and employment began to recover from mid-2009, in part thanks to monetary stimulus. The Canadian economy outperformed those of its G7 peers during the crisis, and Canada was the first G7 nation to have both its Gross Domestic Product (GDP) and employment recover to pre-crisis levels.

The Bank of Canada's decision to provide substantial additional liquidity to the Canadian financial system, and its unusual step of announcing a commitment to keep interest rates at their lowest possible level for one year, appear to have been significant contributors to Canada's weathering of the crisis.

Canada's risk-averse fiscal and regulatory environment is also cited as a factor. In 2009 a Newsweek columnist wrote, "Canada has done more than survive this financial crisis. The country is positively thriving in it. Canadian banks are well capitalized and poised to take advantage of opportunities that American and European banks cannot seize."

Carney earned various accolades for his leadership during the financial crisis: he was named one of Financial Timess "Fifty who will frame the way forward", and of Time Magazine's 2010 Time 100. In May 2011, Reader's Digest named him "Editor's Choice for Most Trusted Canadian".

In October 2012, Carney was named "Central Bank Governor of the Year 2012" by the editors of Euromoney magazine.

International organization memberships

On November 4, 2011, Carney was named Chairman of the Basel-based Financial Stability Board. In a statement, Carney credited his appointment to "the strong reputation of Canada's financial system and the leading role that Canada has played in helping to develop many of the most important international reforms".

The three-year term was a part-time commitment, allowing Carney to complete his term at the Bank of Canada. While there had been no indication of his priorities as chairman, on the day of his appointment the Board published a list of 29 banks that were considered sufficiently large as to pose a risk to the global economy should they fail. At his first press conference as Chairman of the FSB in January 2012, Carney laid out his key priorities for the board.

Carney served as Chairman of the Bank for International Settlements' Committee on the Global Financial System from July 2010 until January 2012.

Carney is a member of the Group of Thirty, an international body of leading financiers and academics, and of the Foundation Board of the World Economic Forum. Carney attended the annual meetings of the Bilderberg Group in 2011, 2012 and 2019.

Governor of the Bank of England
On November 26, 2012, Chancellor of the Exchequer George Osborne announced the appointment of Carney as Governor of the Bank of England. He succeeded Sir Mervyn King on July 1, 2013. He was the first non-Briton to be appointed to the role since the Bank of England was established in 1694. The Bank of England was given additional powers from 2013, such as the ability to set bank capital requirements.

Prior to taking up the post, Carney had already indicated disagreement with the Bank of England's Executive Director of Financial Stability Andy Haldane, specifically on leverage ratios and on bank break-ups. He has been quoted as saying that Haldane does not have a "proper understanding of the facts" on bank regulation. He was thought to have been offered a total pay package of about £624,000 ($844,000 USD) per year, approximately £100,000 ($135,000 USD) more per year than his predecessor.

Since 2020 
Carney was appointed as United Nations special envoy for climate action and finance as he prepared to step down as governor of the Bank of England in March 2020. In January 2020, UK Prime Minister Boris Johnson appointed Carney to the position of finance advisor for the UK presidency of the COP26 United Nations Climate Change conference in Glasgow; at that time the conference was scheduled for November 2020 but it was later postponed to November 2021.

As of October 2020, Carney is vice chairman at Brookfield Asset Management where he leads the firm's environmental, social and governance (ESG) and impact fund investment strategy. In February 2021, Carney had to retract an earlier claim that the $600 billion Brookfield Asset Management portfolio was carbon neutral. He based his claim on the fact that Brookfield has a large renewable energy portfolio and "all the avoided emissions that come with that”. The claim was criticized as accounting tricks as avoided emissions do not counteract the emissions from investments in coal and other fossil fuels responsible for Brookfield's carbon footprint of about 5,200 metric tons of carbon dioxide.

In February 2021, Carney joined the board of fintech company Stripe. As of March 2021, Stripe was valued at $95 billion.

Carney helped launch the Glasgow Financial Alliance for Net Zero (GFANZ) at COP26 in Glasgow in November 2021. He acts as the group's Co-Chair.

Policy views

Risks of increasing wealth inequality
In December 2016, Carney warned of the societal risk of "staggering wealth inequalities" in a Roscoe Lecture at Liverpool John Moores University: "The proportion of the wealth held by the richest 1% of Americans increased from 25% in 1990 to 40% in 2012 ... Globally, the share of wealth held by the richest 1% in the world rose from one-third in 2000 to one-half in 2010."

Brexit
Carney warned many times that Brexit was expected to negatively influence the UK economy. Consequently, Brexit activists accused him of making statements favouring the UK's continued membership of the European Union (EU) before the British EU-membership referendum. He replied that he felt it was his duty to speak up on such issues.

In September 2018, Philip Hammond, the chancellor of the Exchequer, confirmed speculation that Carney would remain as Governor until January 2020, in order to ensure a "smooth" transition after the UK was set to leave the EU on March 29, 2019, a departure deadline that was missed.

In November 2018, Carney warned that large parts of the British economy were not ready for a no-deal Brexit. Speaking on BBC Radio 4's Today Programme, Carney explained that fewer than half of businesses have initiated contingency plans.

In February 2019, speaking about the global economy, Carney provided a less negative perspective on Brexit, stating that globalisation has resulted in "imbalances of democracy and sovereignty", and that Brexit "is the first test of a new global order and could prove the acid test of whether a way can be found to broaden the benefits of openness while enhancing democratic accountability".

Monetary policy in the 2019 international monetary and financial system

In his August 23, 2019, speech delivered at the Federal Reserve Bank of Kansas City's 2019 annual Jackson Hole Economic Symposium at Jackson Lake Lodge, entitled "The Growing Challenges for Monetary Policy in the current International Monetary and Financial System", Carney said that the "widespread use of the US dollar—the dominant currency pricing—in "trade invoicing, in place of the currency of either the producer or the importer" has had a "destablilizing" effect on the global economy, according to Reuters. About 50 percent of international trade relies on the US dollar as the "currency of choice." This represents "five times greater than the US's share in world goods imports, and three times its share in world exports." Dominant currency pricing is not problematic when there is "synchronised growth" globally, Carney said. When "the tide is rising in America while receding elsewhere", the system needs to be revamped. Carney cited  an article by Markus K. Brunnermeier, Harold James, and Jean-Pierre Landau on the potential role of digital currency area (DCA) in redefining the international monetary system.

Speaking only hours after US President Donald Trump had posted on Twitter that he blamed Federal Reserve Chairman Jerome Powell's policies creating fears of an economic recession—and then threatened China with more retaliatory tariffs—Carney urged central banks to work together to replace the US dollar as reserve currency. He cautioned against choosing another new hegemonic reserve currency like the Renminbi and suggested instead, a "new Synthetic Hegemonic Currency (SHC), such as Libra, which could potentially be provided "through a network of central bank digital currencies," that would decrease the US dollar's "domineering influence" on trade worldwide.

Carney also said that the recent increase in the perception that a no-deal Brexit is likely, is "evidenced by betting odds and financial market asset pricing" resulting in the UK now having "the highest FX implied volatility, the highest equity risk premium and lowest real yields of any advanced economy."

Climate change
Carney has taken a leading position on the need for climate action.

Taskforce on Scaling Voluntary Carbon Markets (TSVCM)

In 2020, Carney launched the Taskforce on Scaling Voluntary Carbon Markets—an initiative to increase trading of voluntary carbon offsets— with Bill Winters as Group Chief Executive. The TSVCM is sponsored by the Institute of International Finance. Taskforce members include more than "40 leaders from six continents with backgrounds across the carbon market value chain", including representatives from the Bank of America, BlackRock, Bloomberg's New Energy Finance, BNP Paribas, BP, Boeing, Goldman Sachs, Tata Steel, Total, IHS Markit, and LSE. In a December 3, 2020 Financial Times article, Carney said that the voluntary global carbon offset market was an "imperative" to help reduce emissions. The Times article cited Carney saying London would likely be the host of the new "new pilot market for voluntary carbon offsets" which could be "set up" by December 2021.

Moral to market sentiments
On December 2, 2020, Carney delivered the first of four Reith Lectures—the BBC's flagship annual series. In "How We Get What We Value – From Moral to Market Sentiments", he said society had come to esteem financial value over human value and moved from market economies to market societies. The series covers a trio of crises—credit, Covid and climate.

Personal life
Carney met his wife, Diana Fox, a British economist specializing in developing nations, while at the University of Oxford. She is active in various environmental and social justice causes. The couple married in July 1994 while he was finishing his doctoral thesis. They have four children and lived in Toronto, before moving to the Rockcliffe Park neighbourhood of Ottawa and then moving to London in 2013. They moved back to Ottawa when Mark Carney left his role in the Bank of England.

During his Harvard years, Carney was backup goalie for the school's ice hockey team. Carney continued playing the sport with the Oxford University Ice Hockey Club while studying at Nuffield College, Oxford.

Carney completed the 2015 London Marathon in 03:31:22, which was 17 minutes faster than his time at the 2011 Ottawa Marathon.

Carney speaks fluent French. In addition to his Canadian citizenship, he also holds Irish (two of his grandparents are from County Mayo) and British citizenship. He has distant relatives in Liverpool and is a supporter of the city's Everton F.C. He is also a supporter of the Edmonton Oilers.

There was some controversy with Carney's time running the Bank of England. Staff members compared his temper flare-ups to 'being tasered'.

Honours and distinctions
 Officer of the Order of Canada (OC) 
 Freeman of the City of London
 Honorary degree of Doctor of Laws (LL.D) from the University of Manitoba on April 5, 2013.
 Honorary degree of Doctor of Laws (LL.D) from the University of Alberta in Spring 2016.
 Honorary degree of Doctor of Laws (LL.D) from the University of Toronto on June 18, 2018.
 Honorary degree from the London Business School on July 16, 2019.

References

Further reading

External links

 Biography from the Bank of England

|-

|-

1965 births
Alumni of Nuffield College, Oxford
Alumni of St Peter's College, Oxford
Businesspeople from Edmonton
Honorary Fellows of St Peter's College, Oxford
Harvard Crimson men's ice hockey players
Canadian expatriates in England
Canadian people of Irish descent
20th-century Canadian economists
Goldman Sachs people
Governors of the Bank of Canada
Governors of the Bank of England
Group of Thirty
Harvard College alumni
Living people
Officers of the Order of Canada
People from Fort Smith, Northwest Territories
Canadian ice hockey goaltenders
21st-century Canadian economists